KBDF (98.1 FM) is an American radio station serving the community of Diamond Lake, Oregon. The station's license to cover was held by Larharpol LLC. The station signed on the air on May 23, 2012 with an oldies format, and received its license to cover on June 13, 2012.

History
After winning a frequency auction in May 2011, Tallie Colville of Valley City, North Dakota, applied to the Federal Communications Commission (FCC) in August 2011 for a construction permit for a new broadcast radio station. The FCC granted this permit on October 5, 2011. . The new station was assigned call sign KBDF on October 14, 2011. The permit was assigned to Larharpol LLC on May 3, 2012.

See also
List of radio stations in Oregon

References

External links

BDF
Douglas County, Oregon
2012 establishments in Oregon
Radio stations established in 2012